Michael Homik (born 6 July 1978) is a New Zealand former basketball player. He played 14 seasons in the National Basketball League (NBL) and won four championships. He also played for the Tall Blacks and won a silver medal at the 2006 Commonwealth Games.

Early life
Homik was born and raised in Hamilton, New Zealand, where he attended St John's College.

Basketball career
In 1996, Homik debuted in the NBL for the Waikato Warriors. He played seven games in both 1996 and 1997, before moving to the United States for college. He played two seasons of college basketball for West Valley College before transferring to Albertson College of Idaho.

Homik returned from the United States in 2003 and joined the Auckland Stars. He later joined the New Zealand Breakers for their inaugural season in the Australian NBL in 2003/04. In 2004 and 2005, he was a member of the Stars' back-to-back championship teams.

For the 2006 New Zealand NBL season, Homik played for the Harbour Heat. He went on to spend the next four NBL seasons playing for the Waikato Pistons, including winning championships in 2008 and 2009. During this time, he played a second season in the Australian NBL, this time with the Perth Wildcats in 2007/08.

For the 2011 New Zealand NBL season, Homik joined the Manawatu Jets. However, he played just two games after suffering a broken left ankle. He re-joined the Jets for the 2012 season.

For the 2013 New Zealand NBL season, Homik played for the Wellington Saints.

In April 2015, Homik had a one-game stint with the Manawatu Jets to help them deal with numerous injuries.

Personal
Off the basketball court, Homik has been a stunt man in films such as The Hobbit as well as various television commercials. In 2016, Homik played the role of a villain in the Bollywood film Mohenjo Daro starring Hrithik Roshan.

References

External links
Basketball New Zealand profile
NZNBL stats

1978 births
Living people
Auckland Stars players
Basketball players at the 2006 Commonwealth Games
Commonwealth Games silver medallists for New Zealand
Manawatu Jets players
New Zealand men's basketball players
Sportspeople from Hamilton, New Zealand
Power forwards (basketball)
People educated at St John's College, Hamilton
Waikato Pistons players
Wellington Saints players
Commonwealth Games medallists in basketball
Harbour Heat players
Perth Wildcats players
New Zealand Breakers players
New Zealand expatriate basketball people in Australia
Medallists at the 2006 Commonwealth Games